The men's pole vault event  at the 1979 European Athletics Indoor Championships was held on 25 February in Vienna.

Results

References

Pole vault at the European Athletics Indoor Championships
Pole